The 2014 Bill Beaumont Cup, also known as Bill Beaumont Cup Division One, was the 114th version of the annual, English rugby union, County Championship organized by the RFU for the top tier English counties.  Each county drew its players from rugby union clubs from the third tier and below of the English rugby union league system (typically National League 1, National League 2 South or National League 2 North).  The counties were divided into two regional pools with the winners of each pool meeting in the final held at Twickenham Stadium.  New counties to the competition were the two finalists from the 2013 County Championship Plate final – Northumberland (winners) and North Midlands (runners-up) who replaced Durham and Kent.  Lancashire were the defending champions.  

The northern group was won by Lancashire, qualifying for their sixth successive final by winning all three games, although they had some stiff opposition from rivals Yorkshire and Cheshire on the way.  They were joined by Cornwall, also making their second successive final, who won the southern section in a similar manner, with close wins against Hertfordshire and Gloucestershire getting them through.  Both of the newly promoted counties, Northumberland and North Midlands, made an instant return as they were relegated to the 2015 County Championship Plate at the end of the competition.

In what was a repeat of the previous seasons final, Lancashire once again defeated Cornwall.  Cornwall who were looking to win the championship for the first time in 14 years, actually led 23-10 at half-time, but fell apart in the second, as a rampant Lancashire side scored four tries to finish as victors 38-26.   Lancashire's outstanding player of the tournament was Fylde's Chris Johnson, who scored 60 points over the competition, including 4 tries, while Lewis Vinnicombe, playing for Truro in Tribute Western Counties West, was excellent for Cornwall with 4 tries overall.

Competition format
The competition format was two regional group stages divided into north and south, with each team playing each other once.  This meant that two teams in the pool had two home games, while the other two had just one.  The top side in each group went through to the final held at Twickenham Stadium on 1 June 2014.

Participating Counties and ground locations

Group stage

Division 1 North

Round 1

Round 2

Round 3

Division 1 South

Round 1

Round 2

Round 3

Final

Total season attendances
Does not include final at Twickenham which is a neutral venue and involves teams from all three county divisions on the same day

Individual statistics
 Note if players are tied on tries or points the player with the lowest number of appearances will come first.  Also note that points scorers includes tries as well as conversions, penalties and drop goals.  Appearance figures also include coming on as substitutes (unused substitutes not included).  Statistics will also include final.

Top points scorers

Top try scorers

See also
 English rugby union system
 Rugby union in England

References

External links
 NCA Rugby

2014